Liu Yuzhong (1911 – 31 May 1979) was a Chinese politician. She was among the first group of women elected to the Legislative Yuan in 1948.

Biography
Originally from Xinmin in Liaoning Province, Liu attended Peking National University. She joined the Kuomintang and became chair of its women's committee in Liaobei Province.

In the 1948 elections to the Legislative Yuan, she ran as a Kuomintang candidate in Liaoning and was elected to parliament. She relocated to Taiwan during the Chinese Civil War, where she remained a member of the Legislative Yuan until her death in 1979.

References

1911 births
Members of the Kuomintang
20th-century Chinese women politicians
Members of the 1st Legislative Yuan
Members of the 1st Legislative Yuan in Taiwan
1979 deaths